Elections in Luxembourg are held to determine the political composition of the representative institutions of the Grand Duchy of Luxembourg. Luxembourg is a liberal representative democracy, with universal suffrage guaranteed under the constitution. Elections are held regularly, and are considered to be fair and free.

Separate elections are held to elect representatives at municipal, national and European levels. The main institution to which members are elected is the Chamber of Deputies, the national legislature and the sole source of membership, confidence and supply of the government. Luxembourg is represented by six MEPs to the European Parliament, who are elected simultaneously with elections held in other European Union member states.

The country has a multi-party system, traditionally defined by the existence of three large political parties: the Christian Social People's Party (CSV), the Democratic Party (DP), and the Luxembourg Socialist Workers' Party (LSAP). Historically, the three parties have won a large majority of the votes between them, but their total percentage has fallen recently, such that two additional parties, the Greens and the Alternative Democratic Reform Party (ADR) have recorded over 9% of votes at each of last two legislative elections. The CSV (and its predecessor) has provided the Prime Minister for all but 12 years since 1918, and has always been the largest party in the legislature. In this respect, Luxembourg has certain features of a dominant-party system, although coalition governments are the norm and the two most recent governments do not involve the CSV.

Compulsory voting 
Luxembourg's electoral system operates on the basis of compulsory voting, with a few exceptions.

Luxembourg citizens aged under 75 years who reside in Luxembourg are required to vote, unless they reside in a different municipality from the one in which they are called to vote.

Luxembourg citizens aged over 75 years, as well as Luxembourg citizens of any age who do not reside in Luxembourg, are not required to vote. However, if they choose to register to vote, voting becomes mandatory for them.

Non-Luxembourg citizens who are eligible to vote in municipal and/or European Parliament elections are not automatically required to vote; however, if they choose to register to vote, voting becomes mandatory for them.

The failure of a person to vote when required to law to do so is punishable upon the first offence by a fine of between €100 and €250. A repeat offence within 5 years is punishable by a fine of between €500 and €1,000.

Chamber of Deputies
Luxembourg's national legislature is the unicameral Chamber of Deputies (Luxembourgish Châmber vun Députéirten, French: Chambre des députés, German: Abgeordnetenkammer). The Chamber has 60 members, known as 'deputies', elected for a five-year term in four multi-seat constituencies, known as 'circonscriptions'. Seats are allocated by proportional representation, using the Hagenbach-Bischoff system. The most recent election took place in October 2018 and the next is scheduled for 2023.

Eligibility

To be eligible to vote in elections to the Chamber of Deputies, one must fulfil the following criteria:
 One must be a Luxembourgish citizen.
 One must be eighteen years of age on election day.
 One must never have been convicted of a criminal offence.
 One must otherwise be in full possession of one's political rights (e.g. not be certified as insane).

In addition to the criteria outlined above, to stand for election to the Chamber of Deputies, one must be resident in Luxembourg. Furthermore, one cannot be a candidate if one is a judge or a member of the Council of State.

Circonscriptions

Deputies are elected from four constituencies ('circonscriptions'). They are arranged geographically, as combinations of the twelve traditional cantons. The four circonscriptions are Centre, Est, Nord, Sud.

As the constituencies are based on geographic region and traditional borders, they have greatly differing populations. To reflect this, each circonscription elects a different number of deputies; Sud, with 40% of the national population, elects twenty-three deputies, whilst Est, with only 12% of the population, elects seven. Voters can cast as many votes as their circonscription elects deputies (so, in Est, one can vote for up to seven candidates), which can be spread across party lists or concentrated behind one single party.

Electoral system

The seats are allocated according to the Hagenbach-Bischoff system.

Latest election

European Parliament
Since 1979, Luxembourg has elected members to the European Parliament, which is the primary representative organ of the EU, and, with the Council of the European Union, forms its legislative branch. Due to its small size, the Grand Duchy elects just six members out of a total of 732, which is more than only Malta (which elects five MEPs); nonetheless, Luxembourg's representation is disproportionately large compared to its population, and Luxembourg elects more MEPs per capita than any other country (see: Apportionment in the European Parliament).

MEPs are elected to five-year terms. The exact date of elections is decided by Luxembourg, allowing it to schedule them on the same date as elections to the Chamber of Deputies (as is usually the case).

Eligibility
To be eligible to vote in elections to the European Parliament, one must fulfil the following criteria:
 One must be a citizen of the European Union.
 One must be eighteen years of age on election day.
 One must never have been convicted of a criminal offence.
 One must otherwise be in full possession of one's political rights (e.g. not be certified as insane) in one's own country of citizenship (Luxembourg or another member state).
 If not a Luxembourgish citizen, must have been resident in Luxembourg for at least five of the past six years when enrolling on the electoral register.

In addition to the criteria outlined above, to stand for election to the European Parliament, one must be resident in Luxembourg. There are also extra requirements if one is a non-Luxembourgish citizen, in which case, one must be in full possession of one's political rights in both Luxembourg and one's country of citizenship (if not a Luxembourgish national), and have resided in Luxembourg for the past five years (and not just five of the past six).

Electoral system

The seats are allocated according to the D'Hondt method.

Latest election

Past elections
1999 European election
2004 European election
2009 European election
2014 European election

Local elections
Each commune (municipality) has an elected communal council. The number of councillors varies from 7 to 19 based on the number of inhabitants; the exception being the City of Luxembourg where its communal council consists of 27 members.

The councillors are directly elected every six years on the second Sunday of October. The last elections were held on 8 October 2017. The law of 15 December 2017 further defines that, in case the parliamentary and communal elections coincide, the latter are held in June of that year.

Referendums
The referendum was introduced into the Constitution of Luxembourg by the constitutional revision of 1919. The Constitution mentions the referendum in Article 51: "Voters will be asked to vote by way of referendum in the cases and under the conditions determined by law." The only details about execution of referendums are found in Article 114 which deals with constitutional amendments. There are no other provisions regarding referendums in Luxembourg.

The Constitution amendment first has to be passed by two-thirds absolute super-majority of the Parliament, and then:
 either passed again after at least three months under the same terms,
 or passed on the referendum, if a referendum is requested in first two months of the three-month period by
 either one quarter of members of the Parliament
 or 25 thousand registered voters.

The referendum on constitutional amendment (defined in Article 114) is binding. Referendums in general (defined in Article 51) are not explicitly stated to be binding.

The general framework of the organizational arrangements of referendums is established by "The Act of 4 February 2005 on the national referendum".

There were four referendums in Luxembourg since 1919:
 the referendum on head of state and economic union in 1919
 the referendum on banning the Communist party in 1937
 European Constitution referendum in 2005
 Luxembourg constitutional referendum in 2015
None of the referendums were constitutional amendments, so were non-binding.

See also
 Electoral calendar
 Electoral system

Footnotes

Further reading

External links
Luxembourg at Adam Carr's Election Archive
Luxembourg at Parties and Elections